4525 Johnbauer, provisional designation , is dark Mitidika asteroid from the central regions of the asteroid belt, approximately 10 kilometers in diameter. It was discovered on 15 May 1982, by astronomer couple Eleanor and Eugene Shoemaker, as well as Peter Wilder at the Palomar Observatory in California, United States. The asteroid was named after John Bauer, physics teacher at San Diego City College.

Orbit and classification 

Johnbauer has been identified as a member of the Mitidika family, a dispersed asteroid family of typically carbonaceous C-type asteroids. The family is named after 2262 Mitidika (diameter of 9 km) and consists of 653 known members, the largest ones being 404 Arsinoë (95 km) and 5079 Brubeck (17 km).

It orbits the Sun in the central main-belt at a distance of 2.1–3.1 AU once every 4 years and 2 months (1,507 days). Its orbit has an eccentricity of 0.20 and an inclination of 14° with respect to the ecliptic.

The body's observation arc begins more than 26 years prior to its official discovery observation, with a precovery taken at Palomar in November 1955.

Physical characteristics

Rotation period 

As of 2017, no rotational lightcurve of Johnbauer has been obtained from photometric observations. The body's rotation period, spin axis and shape remains unknown.

Diameter and albedo 

According to the survey carried out by the NEOWISE mission of NASA's Wide-field Infrared Survey Explorer, Johnbauer measures 10.118 kilometers in diameter and its surface has a low albedo of 0.034.

Naming 

This minor planet was named in memory of John Bauer (1932–2002), a long-time teacher of astronomy and physics at San Diego City College in San Diego, California, who over the course of forty years (1962-2002), inspired hundreds of students to pursue professional and academic careers in astronomy and physics. The name was suggested by N. Butler. The official naming citation was published by the Minor Planet Center on 13 April 2006.

References

External links 
 Asteroid Lightcurve Database (LCDB), query form (info )
 Dictionary of Minor Planet Names, Google books
 Asteroids and comets rotation curves, CdR – Observatoire de Genève, Raoul Behrend
 Discovery Circumstances: Numbered Minor Planets (1)-(5000) – Minor Planet Center
 
 

004525
Discoveries by Eleanor F. Helin
Discoveries by Eugene Merle Shoemaker
Named minor planets
19820515